The 2023 World Archery Championships will be held from 31 July to 6 August 2023 in Berlin, Germany. The event will serve as a qualification event for the 2024 Summer Olympics in Paris, France.

Medals summary

Recurve

Compound

References

External links
 Official Website

World Archery Championships
World Championships
World Archery Championships
International archery competitions hosted by Germany
Archery in Germany
World Archery Championships
World Archery Championships
Archery